Gremlins is a 1984 American black comedy horror film directed by Joe Dante, written by Chris Columbus, and starring Zach Galligan, Phoebe Cates, Hoyt Axton, Polly Holliday, and Frances Lee McCain, with Howie Mandel providing the voice of Gizmo, the main mogwai character. It draws on legends of folkloric mischievous creatures that cause malfunctions—"gremlins"—in the British Royal Air Force going back to World War II. The story follows a young man who receives a strange creature as a pet, which then spawns other creatures who transform into small, destructive, mischievous monsters that all wreak havoc on a whole town on Christmas Eve.

The film was the center of large merchandising campaigns and opts for black comedy, balanced against a Christmastime setting. Steven Spielberg was the film's executive producer, with the film being produced by Michael Finnell.

Gremlins was theatrically released on June 8, 1984 by Warner Bros. to critical and commercial success. However, it was heavily criticized for some of its more violent sequences.  In response to this and to similar complaints about Indiana Jones and the Temple of Doom, Spielberg suggested that the Motion Picture Association of America (MPAA) alter its rating system, which it did within two months of the film's release, creating a new PG-13 rating. It was followed by a sequel, Gremlins 2: The New Batch, in 1990, which has a more satirical tone and parodies Hollywood sequels, to generally positive reviews from critics, but was a box-office bomb.

Plot 

Struggling inventor Randall Peltzer visits a Chinatown antique store, hoping to find a Christmas present for his son Billy. The owner, Mr. Wing, refuses to sell Randall the creature, but his grandson secretly does, warning Randall to remember three important rules: do not expose the mogwai to light, especially sunlight, which will kill it; do not let it come in contact with water; and above all, never feed it after midnight.

Randall returns home to Kingston Falls, where he gives the mogwai to Billy as a pet. Billy works in the local bank, but fears that his dog Barney will be put down by widowed miser Mrs. Deagle. Randall names the mogwai "Gizmo" and explains the three rules. Gizmo is friendly and docile, but when Billy's young friend Pete accidentally spills water over Gizmo, five more mogwai spawn from his back, a more troublemaking sort led by the aggressive Stripe, named for the tuft of fur on his head. Billy shows one of the mogwai to his former elementary school science teacher, Mr. Hanson, spawning another mogwai, on whom Hanson experiments. Back at home, Stripe and his fellow mogwai trick Billy into feeding them after midnight by severing the power cord on his alarm clock. They form cocoons, as does Hanson's mogwai, which soon hatch, emerging as mischievous, dark green, reptilian monsters, who then torture Gizmo and attack Billy's mother, Lynn. Hanson is killed by his gremlin.

Lynn and Billy are able to kill off the gremlins, except for Stripe, who escapes to a local YMCA. There, Stripe jumps into the swimming pool, spawning an army of gremlins who wreak havoc in Kingston Falls. Many people are injured or outright killed by the gremlins' rampage, including Mrs. Deagle. Billy reports this to the police, but they prove to be no help as they don't believe his story, even after he shows them Gizmo.

As Billy rescues his girlfriend, Kate Beringer, they hide in the now-abandoned bank where Kate reveals to Billy and Gizmo why she hates Christmas: when she was nine years old, her father went missing on Christmas Eve and did not come home on Christmas Day either; several days later, he was found dead in their chimney while dressed as Santa Claus. Planning to surprise her and her mother, he had accidentally slipped and broken his neck while climbing down the chimney. Still suffering from post-traumatic stress disorder because of the event, Kate confesses this is how she discovered the truth about Santa Claus.

Billy and Kate discover that the town has fallen silent and the gremlins are watching Snow White and the Seven Dwarfs in the local theater. They set off a natural gas explosion, incinerating all the gremlins except for Stripe, who left to commandeer more candy at a Montgomery Ward store across the street. As morning approaches, they follow Stripe into the department store, where Stripe attempts to use a water fountain to spawn more gremlins. Gizmo opens a skylight, exposing Stripe to sunlight, killing him.

As the local news reports on the day's mysterious tragedies, Mr. Wing reclaims Gizmo at the Peltzer home. He criticizes both the Peltzers' and Western society for their carelessness with nature. However, as he turns to leave, Gizmo, having bonded with Billy, bids the young man goodbye. A touched Mr. Wing then concedes that Billy may be ready one day, and until then, Gizmo will be waiting.

Cast

Voices 
 Howie Mandel as Gizmo
 Frank Welker as Stripe
 Don Steele as Rockin' Ricky Rialto
 Marvin Miller as Robby The Robot (uncredited)
Mogwai and Gremlin vocal effects provided by Brad Kesten (uncredited), Michael Winslow, Bob Bergen, Fred Newman, Peter Cullen, Jim Cummings (uncredited), Sonny Melendrez (uncredited), Mark Dodson, Bob Holt, and Michael Sheehan.

Cameos 
 Steven Spielberg as Man Riding recumbent bicycle
 Jim McKrell as Lew Landers
 Jerry Goldsmith as man in phone booth
 William Schallert as Father Bartlett
 Chuck Jones as Mr. Jones, Billy's Drawing Mentor
 Kenneth Tobey as Smoking Gas Station Attendant

Production

Background 
Gremlins was produced at a time when combining horror and comedy was becoming increasingly popular. According to Professor Noël Carroll, Ghostbusters, released the same weekend as Gremlins, and the comic strip The Far Side also followed this trend. Carroll argued that there was now a new genre emphasizing sudden shifts between humorous and horrific scenes, drawing laughs with plot elements that have been traditionally used to scare.

The notion of gremlins was first conceived during the 1920s when mechanical failures in RAF aircraft were jokingly blamed on the small monsters. The term "gremlins" also entered popular culture as children's author and RAF pilot Roald Dahl published a book called The Gremlins in 1943, based on the mischievous creatures. Walt Disney considered making a film of it. A Bugs Bunny cartoon of the era, Falling Hare, has him battling a gremlin on an airplane. Joe Dante had read The Gremlins and said that the book was of some influence on his film. In 1983, Dante publicly distanced his work from earlier films, explaining, "Our gremlins are somewhat different—they're sort of green and they have big mouths and they smile a lot and they do incredibly, really nasty things to people and enjoy it all the while".

Development 

The story of Gremlins was conceived by Chris Columbus. As Columbus explained, his inspiration came from his loft, when at night "what sounded like a platoon of mice would come out and to hear them skittering around in the blackness was really creepy". He then wrote the original screenplay as a spec script to show potential employers that he had writing abilities. The story was not actually intended to be filmed until Steven Spielberg took an interest in turning it into a film. As Spielberg explained, "It's one of the most original things I've come across in many years, which is why I bought it." Spielberg considered Tim Burton to direct the film after seeing his Short film Frankenweenie.

After deciding to executive produce the film, Spielberg chose Dante as his director because of his experience with horror-comedy; Dante had previously directed The Howling (1981); however, in the time between The Howling and the offer to film Gremlins, he had experienced a lull in his career.  Dante began doing storyboard work on the film while also working as a director on Twilight Zone: The Movie (1983), a film which Spielberg also served as a director on. The film's producer was Michael Finnell, who had also worked on The Howling with Dante. Spielberg took the project to Warner Bros. and co-produced it through his own company, Amblin Entertainment.

The film's script went through a few drafts before a shooting script was finalized. The first version was much darker than the final film. Various scenes were cut, including one which portrayed Billy's mother dying in her struggle with the gremlins, with her head thrown down the stairs when Billy arrives. Dante later explained the scene made the film darker than the filmmakers wanted. There was also a scene where the gremlins ate Billy's dog and a scene where the gremlins attacked a McDonald's, eating customers instead of burgers. Also, instead of Stripe being a mogwai who becomes a gremlin, there was originally no mogwai named Stripe; rather, Gizmo was supposed to transform into Stripe the gremlin. Spielberg overruled this plot element as he felt Gizmo was cute and that audiences would want him to be present throughout the film.

The film mentions an urban legend in which Kate reveals in a speech that her father died at Christmas when he dressed as Santa Claus and broke his neck while climbing down the family's chimney. After the film was completed, studio executives insisted upon its removal, because they felt it was too ambiguous as to whether it was supposed to be funny or sad. Dante refused to take the scene out, saying it represented the film as a whole, which had a combination of horrific and comedic elements. Spielberg did not like the scene but, despite his creative control, he viewed Gremlins as Dante's project and allowed him to leave it in. A parody of this scene is featured in Gremlins 2: The New Batch.

Casting 

Phoebe Cates was cast as Kate, Billy's girlfriend, despite concerns that she was known for playing more risqué parts, such as Linda Barrett in Fast Times at Ridgemont High (1982). Spielberg urged the casting of the relatively unknown Zach Galligan as Billy because he saw chemistry between Galligan and Cates during auditions. Galligan later compared himself to Billy, saying he was a "geeky kid", and that being in the film "was really kind of a dream" given "what I get to do, what my character gets to do, blow up movie theatres", adding that he "got to work with great people".  Spielberg commented when Galligan was testing with Cates that "he's in love with her already" and that was how Galligan won the part. Emilio Estevez and Judd Nelson also auditioned.

In contrast to Galligan, many of the supporting actors and actresses were better known. Veteran actor Glynn Turman portrayed the high school science teacher whose study of a newborn mogwai leads to his death after it forms a cocoon and emerges as a vicious gremlin. Dick Miller, who was a regular in Dante's films, was another experienced actor on the set, playing a World War II veteran who first refers to the creatures as gremlins. Rand was played by Hoyt Axton, who was always the filmmakers' preferred choice for the role even though it was widely contested by other actors. Axton's experience included acting as the father in The Black Stallion (1979), and he was also a country music singer-songwriter. After an introductory scene to Gremlins was cut, Axton's voice earned him the added role of the narrator to establish some context. Mr. Wing was played by Keye Luke, a renowned film actor, whose film career spanned half a century. Although in reality he was around 80 at the time of filming, and his character was very elderly, Luke's youthful appearance had to be covered by make-up.

Corey Feldman, who up to that time had primarily been in commercials, played Pete Fountaine, establishing his early credentials as a child actor. Polly Holliday, an actress best known for her role in Alice, played Mrs. Deagle. Dante considered the casting fortunate, as she was well-known and he considered her to be talented. Two other well-known actors, Fast Times Judge Reinhold and character actor Edward Andrews, received roles that were significantly reduced after the film was edited; they played Billy's superiors at the bank.

Special effects 

Some of the performances were shot on the Courthouse Square and Colonial Street sets of the Universal Studios Lot in Universal City, California (Mrs. Deagle's house was one such set as well as the opening street scenes in Chinatown, which were filmed on the Warner Bros. Studios backlot). This required fake snow; Dante also felt it was an atmosphere that would make the special effects more convincing. As the special effects relied mainly on puppetry (an earlier attempt to use monkeys was abandoned because the test monkey panicked when made to wear a gremlin head), the actors worked alongside some of the puppets. Nevertheless, after the actors finished their work for good, a great deal of effort was spent finishing the effects. Numerous small rubber puppets, some of which were mechanical, were used to portray Gizmo and the gremlins. They were designed by Chris Walas. There was more than one Gizmo puppet, and occasionally Galligan, when carrying one, would set him down off camera, and when Gizmo appeared again sitting on a surface it was actually a different puppet wired to the surface. These puppets had many limitations. The Gizmo puppets were particularly frustrating because they were smaller and thus broke down more. While Walas recommended making the mogwais larger to make their creation and functioning easier for the special effects team, Dante insisted on keeping their size small to enhance the cuteness of the creatures. Consequently, to satisfy the crew, a scene was included in which the gremlins hang Gizmo on a wall and throw darts at him. This was included on a list that the crew created known to them as the "Horrible Things to do to Gizmo" list.

A few marionettes were also used. Other effects required large mogwai faces and ears to be produced for close-ups, as the puppets were less capable of conveying emotion. Consequently, large props simulating food were needed for the close-ups in the scene in which the mogwai feast after midnight. An enlarged Gizmo puppet was also needed for the scene in which he multiplies. The new mogwai, who popped out of Gizmo's body as small, furry balls which then started to grow, were balloons and expanded as such. Walas had also created the exploding gremlin in the microwave by means of a balloon that was allowed to burst.

Howie Mandel provided the voice for Gizmo, and prolific voice actor Frank Welker provided the voice for Stripe. It was Welker who suggested Mandel perform in Gremlins. The puppets' lines were mostly invented by the voice actors, based on cues from the physical actions of the puppets, which were filmed before the voice work. When developing the voice for Gizmo, Mandel explained, "[Gizmo was] cute and naive, so, you know, I got in touch with that... I couldn't envision going any other way or do something different with it". The majority of the other gremlins' voices were performed by Michael Winslow and Peter Cullen, while the remaining voices were done by Bob Bergen, Fred Newman, Mark Dodson, Bob Holt, and Michael Sheehan.

Music 
The film's score was composed by Jerry Goldsmith, who won a Saturn Award for Best Music for his efforts. The main score was composed with the objective of conveying "the mischievous humor and mounting suspense of Gremlins". Goldsmith also wrote Gizmo's song, which was hummed by a child actress and acquaintance of Goldsmith, rather than Mandel himself. Goldsmith also appears in the film, alongside Steven Spielberg, in the scene where Rand calls home from the salesman's convention.

The soundtrack album was released by Geffen Records as a specially priced mini-album on LP and cassette (Goldsmith's music comprised all of side two) and reissued on compact disc in 1993 only in Germany.

 Gremlins...Mega Madness – Michael Sembello (3:50)
 Make It Shine – Quarterflash (4:10)
 Out/Out – Peter Gabriel (7:00)
 The Gift (4:51)
 Gizmo (4:09)
 Mrs. Deagle (2:50)
 The Gremlin Rag (4:03)

"Gremlins...Mega Madness" was also released as a single, with "The Gremlin Rag" as its B-side.

In 2011, Film Score Monthly issued a two-disc release of the soundtrack, with the complete score on disc one and the original soundtrack album on disc two (representing the latter's first North American CD issue); this was the label's final Jerry Goldsmith album.

DISC ONE: The Film Score

 Fanfare in C (Max Steiner) / The Shop / The Little One 4:30
 Late for Work 1:46
 Mrs. Deagle / That Dog 2:22
 The Gift 1:45
 First Aid 2:17
 Spilt Water 3:02
 A New One 1:10
 The Lab / Old Times 2:35
 The Injection 2:56
 Snack Time / The Wrong Time 1:49
 The Box 1:24
 First Aid 1:39
 Disconnected / Hurry Home 1:03
 Kitchen Fight 4:06
 Dirty Linen 0:43
 The Pool 1:07
 The Plow / Special Delivery 1:16
 High Flyer 2:22
 Too Many Gremlins 2:06
 No Santa Claus 3:27
 After Theatre 1:39
 Theatre Escape / Stripe Is Loose / Toy Dept. / No Gizmo 4:36
 The Fountain / Stripe's Death 5:42
 Goodbye, Billy 2:56
 End Title / The Gremlin Rag 4:10
 Blues 2:17
 Mrs. Deagle [film version] 1:27
 God Rest You Merry, Gentlemen [traditional, arr. Alexander Courage] 1:12
 After Theatre [with "Silent Night"] 1:36
 After Theatre [without "Silent Night"] 1:36
 Rabbit Rampage [Milt Franklyn] 0:47
 The Gremlin Rag [full version] 3:35
 Gizmo's New Song 0:35
 Gizmo's Trumpet 0:30

Tracks 26–34 are listed as bonus tracks.

DISC TWO: 1984 Soundtrack Album
 Gremlins...Mega Madness – Michael Sembello 3:52
 Make It Shine – Quarterflash 4:11
 Out/Out – Peter Gabriel 7:02
 The Gift 4:58
 Gizmo 4:14
 Mrs. Deagle 2:54
 The Gremlin Rag 4:13

Reception

Box office 

Financially, Gremlins was a success. Produced on an $11 million budget, it was more expensive than Spielberg had originally intended but still relatively cheap for its time. The trailer introduced the film to audiences by briefly explaining that Billy receives a strange creature as a Christmas present, by going over the three rules, and then coming out with the fact that the creatures transform into terrible monsters. This trailer showed little of either the mogwai or the gremlins. In contrast to this, other advertisements concentrated on Gizmo, overlooked the gremlins, and made the film look similar to Spielberg's earlier family film E.T. the Extra-Terrestrial (1982).

Gremlins was released into North American theaters on June 8, 1984, the same day as Ivan Reitman's Ghostbusters. Gremlins ranked second, with $12.5 million in its first weekend, $1.1 million less than Ghostbusters. By the end of its American screenings on November 29, it had grossed $148,168,459 domestically. This made it the fourth highest-grossing film of the year, behind Beverly Hills Cop, Ghostbusters, and Indiana Jones and the Temple of Doom. In August 1984, it opened in Argentina and Spain, and in October it premiered in West Germany. Screenings began in Mexico, Australia, and much of the rest of Europe in December. Since Gremlins had an international audience, different versions of the film were made to overcome cultural barriers. Mandel learned to speak his few intelligible lines, such as "Bright light!", in various languages, including German. Regional music and humor were also incorporated into foreign-language versions. Dante credited this work as being one of the factors which helped to make Gremlins a worldwide success. However, many critics questioned the summer release date of the film in America, as the film takes place during the Christmas holiday season, causing them to comment that it should have had a Christmas release date instead.

In addition to this, there were also complaints from audiences about the violence depicted in the film. These complaints were particularly present in people who had brought their children to see the film, many of whom walked out of the theater before the film had ended. Dante admitted to reporters later that "the idea of taking a 4-year-old to see Gremlins, thinking it's going to be a cuddly, funny animal movie and then seeing that it turns into a horror picture, I think people were upset... They felt like they had been sold something family friendly and it wasn't entirely family friendly".

The film became available to audiences again when it was brought back to theaters on August 30, 1985. This additional release brought its gross up to $153,083,102.

By February 1985, the film had grossed $59.6 million internationally, including $17 million in Japan. It grossed a further $0.2 million in 2019, taking its worldwide gross to over $212.9 million.

Critical response 
Roger Ebert approved of the film, awarding three out of four stars and declaring it to not only be "fun", but also a "sly series of send-ups", effectively parodying many elemental film storylines. In his opinion, Gremlins did this partly through depictions of mysterious worlds (the shop in Chinatown) and tyrannical elderly women (Mrs. Deagle). Ebert also believed the rule in which a mogwai cannot eat after midnight was inspired by fairy tales, and that the final scenes parody classic horror films. He connected Kate's speech about her father with "the great tradition of 1950s sick jokes". Gene Siskel gave the film three-and-a-half out of four stars, describing it as "a wickedly funny and slightly sick ride," and "a most original work. We're aware at every moment that someone is trying to entertain us. Playfulness abounds." Vincent Canby of The New York Times was mixed, writing that the film "is far more interested in showing off its knowledge of movie lore and making random jokes than in providing consistent entertainment. Unfortunately, it's funniest when being most nasty." Variety declared, "Make room for adorable 'Gremlins' dolls on the shelves and start counting the take for another calculated audience pleaser from the Steven Spielberg-Frank Marshall-Kathleen Kennedy team. But that's all that's here in this showy display of technical talent, otherwise nearly heedless of dramatic concerns." Leonard Maltin disapproved of the film, and his view was made clear in remarks he made on the television show Entertainment Tonight. He called the film "icky" and "gross". He later wrote that despite being set in a "picture-postcard town" and blending the feel of It's a Wonderful Life (a clip of which appears in Gremlins) with that of The Blob, the film is "negated by too-vivid violence and mayhem"; giving the film two out of four stars. Maltin later made a cameo appearance in Gremlins 2, repeating his criticisms of the original on film, as an in-joke, before being throttled by the creatures; he later gave the second film a more positive rating, three out of four stars.

While some critics criticized the film's depictions of violence and greed—such as death scenes, Kate's speech, and the gremlins' gluttony—for lacking comic value, scholar Charlotte Miller instead interpreted these as a satire of "some characteristics of Western civilization", suggesting that Westerners may take too much satisfaction from violence. Gremlins can also be interpreted as a statement against technology, in that some characters, such as Billy's father, are overly dependent on it. In contrast, Mr. Wing is shown to have a strong distaste for television. Kirkpatrick Sale also interpreted Gremlins as an anti-technology film in his book Rebels Against the Future.  Another scholar suggested that the film is meant to express a number of observations of society by having the gremlin characters shift in what they are meant to represent. At different times, they are depicted as teenagers, the wealthy establishment, or fans of Disney films.

Another scholar drew a connection between the microwave scene and urban legends about pets dying in microwave ovens. He described the portrayal of this urban legend in the film as successful, but that meant it seemed terrible. This is indeed a scene that is thought of as being one of the film's most violent depictions; with even Roger Ebert expressing some fear in his review that the film might encourage children to try similar things with their pets.

Colin Greenland reviewed Gremlins for Imagine magazine, and stated that "Two or three good jokes, three or four neat scenes, lots of detail, but overall a manic melee of pyrotechnics that made random grabs for my sympathy and failed to hold my attention, A bit more coherent thought, and who knows, it might have been something good."

Gremlins has been criticized for more than its depictions of violence. One BBC critic wrote in 2000 that "The plot is thin and the pacing is askew". However, that critic also complimented the dark humour contrasted against the ideal Christmas setting. In 2002, another critic wrote that in hindsight, Gremlins has "corny special effects" and that the film will tend to appeal to children more so than to adults; he also said the acting was dull.

Despite the initial mixed criticism, Gremlins has continued to receive critical praise over the years and is considered by many as one of the best films of 1984.
On review aggregator Rotten Tomatoes, the film holds a "Certified Fresh" approval rating of 86% based on 76 reviews, with an average rating of 7.4/10. The website's critical consensus reads, "Whether you choose to see it as a statement on consumer culture or simply a special effects-heavy popcorn flick, Gremlins is a minor classic." On Metacritic, the film received a score of 70 based on 13 reviews, indicatng "generally favorable reviews".

Accolades

Home media 
Warner Home Video released Gremlins on VHS, CED Videodisc, and Beta in 1985. Gremlins made $79,500,000 in video rental stores. The film was released on DVD in 1997 in a bare bones presentation. It included both full screen and widescreen versions and the film's trailer. It was repackaged in 1999 with the same disc, but a different cover. On August 20, 2002, a "special edition" DVD was released, which featured cast and filmmakers' commentary and deleted scenes. A 25th anniversary Blu-ray edition was released on December 1, 2009. The film was again released on home video in 4K Ultra HD on October 1, 2019.

Controversies 

Since its release, the film has been criticized as being culturally insensitive. Jonathan Rosenbaum argued that the film compares gremlins to African Americans.

In Ceramic Uncles & Celluloid Mammies, Patricia Turner writes that the gremlins "reflect negative African-American stereotypes" in their dress and behavior. They are shown "devouring fried chicken with their hands", listening to black music, breakdancing, and wearing sunglasses after dark and newsboy caps, a style common among African American males in the 1980s. She argues that the choice of the film's only African-American character, Roy, as the first victim suggests that his "punishment may be for pursuing a place in a predominantly white society". Turner groups Gremlins together with Little Shop of Horrors as films that show fears of African-Americans "without realizing it", although she credits the film with containing "a rather charming love story".

Turner also claims that the origin of the gremlins with a Chinese character suggests that "no one in the dominant culture is to blame for the havoc wrecked [sic] by the unruly aliens".

Merchandising

Toys and collectibles 
With its commercial themes, particularly the cuteness of the character Gizmo, Gremlins became the center of considerable merchandising. Due to this, it became part of a rising trend in film, which had received a boost from Spielberg's E.T. the Extra-Terrestrial. Manufacturers including LJN produced versions of Gizmo as dolls or stuffed animals, the latter of which became a popular high demand toy during the holiday season of 1984. Both Gizmo and the gremlins were mass-produced as action figures, and Topps printed trading cards based upon the film. 

A Gizmo toy was produced which was a spinoff of furby.

A product placement deal with fast food chain Hardee's also led to a series of five book-and-cassette/45 records adaptations of the film's story. Starting in the early 2000s, companies such as Jun Planning and the National Entertainment Collectibles Association produced all-new Gremlins toys and collectibles. In 2017 Trick or Treat Studios began producing official Gremlins life-size puppets of Stripe and Gizmo. In May 2019, NECA unveiled their Christmas 2019 collectible, which features two Gremlins singing carols.

Novel 
The screenplay was adapted into a novelization by George Gipe, published by Avon Books in June 1984. The novel offered an origin for mogwai and gremlins as a prologue. Supposedly, mogwai were created as gentle, contemplative creatures by a scientist on an alien world. However, it was discovered their physiology was unstable. The end result was only 1 in 10,000 mogwai would retain their sweet, loving demeanor. The rest would change into creatures the novel referred to as "mischievous".  The minority mogwai (the 1 in 10,000) are immortal by human standards, though Gizmo explains to Stripe if he were to undergo the transformation himself, he would become like the others, "short lived and violent." This origin is unique to the novel but is referred to in the novelization of Gremlins 2 by David Bischoff. No definitive origin for mogwai or gremlins is given in either Gremlins film. The novelization contains a subplot that was cut from the original film, where the National Guard plans to neutralize the gremlins with fire hoses.

Video games

Action-oriented video games 
Several officially licensed video games based on the film have been produced. One of the first was Gremlins, released by Atari, Inc. for their 2600 console.

Atari, Inc. released a completely different (and more technically advanced) game—also called Gremlins—for the Atari 5200 console and the Apple II, Commodore 64, and IBM PC computers. Although the Atari 5200 version went to manufacturing in 1984, the turmoil surrounding Jack Tramiel's takeover of Atari's consumer business resulted in it not being released until 1986.

In the 2000s, more games were released; Gremlins: Unleashed! was released on Game Boy Color in 2001. The game was about Gizmo trying to catch Stripe and thirty other gremlins, while the gremlins also try to turn Gizmo into a gremlin. Both Gizmo and Stripe are playable characters in the game.

A Gremlins Team Pack was released for Lego Dimensions on November 18, 2016. The pack includes minifigures of Gizmo and Stripe, a constructible polaroid camera and RC car, and grants access to an Adventure World and Battle Arena based on the film. Howie Mandel and Frank Welker reprise their respective roles as Gizmo and Stripe, while Phoebe Cates, Hoyt Axton and Frances Lee McCain reprise as non-playable characters Kate Beringer, Randall Peltzer and Lynn Peltzer respectively.

Gremlins: The Adventure 

At the time of the film's release, an interactive fiction game based on scenes from the film, entitled Gremlins: The Adventure (1985), was released for various home computers, including the Acorn Electron, the BBC Micro, the Commodore 64 and the ZX Spectrum. The game was written by Brian Howarth for Adventure Soft and was text-based, with full-color illustrations on some formats.

Miscellaneous 
In addition to this, Gremlins brand breakfast cereal was produced by Ralston concurrent to and for a few years after the first film was released in 1984. The front of the cereal box featured Gizmo, and inside were decals of the malevolent gremlins, including Stripe.

Legacy 
The film not only spawned the sequel, Gremlins 2: The New Batch, and an advertisement for British Telecom, but is believed to have been the inspiration for several unrelated films about small monsters. These include Ghoulies, Troll, Hobgoblins, and Munchies.

In music, the Scottish post-rock band Mogwai are named after the film's creatures: as for the reason why the band chose this as their name, their guitarist, Stuart Braithwaite, has stated that "it has no significant meaning and we always intended on getting a better one, but like a lot of other things we never got round to it". Welsh singer and songwriter Rod Thomas performs under the name Bright Light Bright Light, which is a direct quote from the film.

In January 2013, Vulture reported that Warner Bros. was negotiating with Amblin Entertainment to reboot the Gremlins franchise. Seth Grahame-Smith was tapped to produce, alongside David Katzenberg. In January 2015, Grahame-Smith stated that the project has been put on hold. In November 2015, Zach Galligan confirmed that the third film will be a sequel and not a reboot.

In a December 2016 interview with Bleeding Cool, Galligan again spoke about a third film saying that "Warner Bros. definitely wants it, Chris Columbus wants to do it because he’d like to undo the Gremlins 2 thing as he wasn’t thrilled with it, and Spielberg wants to." He claimed Gremlins 3 is being written by Carl Ellsworth. In an interview with /Film in 2017, a script was written by Chris Columbus. His script explored the idea that has been on the fan's mind for a long time: "if all the gremlins come from getting Gizmo wet and feeding his mogwai offspring after midnight, should Gizmo be eliminated?" He described his script as "twisted and dark".

In November 18, 2016, both Gizmo and Stripe made their appearance in Lego Dimensions as playable characters in their own Team Pack. Many of the other in-game playable characters, such as Supergirl, hint not to give gremlins water or light. Gizmo and Stripe also each have their own unique abilities and vehicles; Gizmo has the RC Car and Stripe gets the Flash 'n' Finish.

In 2017, gremlins were featured in the animated film The Lego Batman Movie, with director Chris McKay explaining he loved the characters. The gremlins were among numerous villains from outside of the Batman franchise playing a role in the film, with many of the added antagonists owned by Warner Bros.

In 2019, Warner Bros. successfully gained registered trademark of the name and the franchise. That same year, the studio's parent company WarnerMedia greenlit an animated series, Gremlins: Secrets of the Mogwai based on the property for its streaming service, HBO Max.

In February 2021, a Mountain Dew Zero Sugar ad featuring Zach Galligan and Gizmo was released.

Also in 2021, a trio of Gremlins including Stripe appear in Space Jam: A New Legacy. They were shown running towards the site of the basketball game between the Tune Squad and the Goon Squad and can be seen cheering from on top of the blue Bronto-Crane from The Flintstones.

Both Gizmo and Stripe appear as playable characters in the 2022 fighting game MultiVersus.

Impact 
In response to some of the more violent sequences in the film, and with similar complaints about Indiana Jones and the Temple of Doom, Spielberg suggested that the Motion Picture Association of America (MPAA) alter its rating system by introducing an intermediary between the PG and R ratings. The MPAA concurred, and a new PG-13 rating was introduced within two months after the film's release.

See also 
 Warner Bros. Classics & Great Gremlins Adventure (a.k.a. Gremlins Invasion), two defunct amusement rides themed after the film
 Holiday horror
 List of films set around Christmas

Notes

References

Bibliography

External links 
 
 
 
 
 
 
 
 Gremlins in the Mix – Article on  Gremlins  and genre-blending

1980s Christmas horror films
1980s monster movies
1984 horror films
1984 comedy films
1980s comedy horror films
Amblin Entertainment films
American Christmas films
American comedy horror films
American monster movies
American Christmas horror films
American dark fantasy films
1980s English-language films
Fictional humanoids
Film controversies
Films directed by Joe Dante
Puppet films
Films using stop-motion animation
Films scored by Jerry Goldsmith
Films shot in Los Angeles
Gremlins (franchise)
Films with screenplays by Chris Columbus
African-American-related controversies in film
Race-related controversies in film
Warner Bros. films
American Christmas comedy films
Films about gremlins
Films set in a movie theatre
Films set in New York (state)
1980s American films